Presidential elections were held in Iran on 11 June 1993, which resulted in the re-election of the incumbent president, Akbar Hashemi Rafsanjani.

Rafsanjani's vote declined dramatically in comparison to the previous election amid a lower turnout. According to Anoushiravan Ehteshami, "little separated the candidates from each other" and "real choices and real alternatives" were absent. Out of 128 candidates who registered to run, only 4 were approved.  The voter turnout was roughly half of all registered voters at 16,796,787.  Discontent with the economic situation and voter apathy are the other reasons cited for the relatively low turnout in the election.

United Press International reported an independent survey have found "the bulk of those who stayed away did so because they were displeased with the clergy or did not believe their vote would make any difference to the government."

Campaign 

None of the candidates enjoyed comparable stature to the incumbent president.

Economic situation was the main issue in the elections. Rafsanjani, whose economic liberalization and privatisation policies were ongoing, said he will concentrate on economics and 'reconstruction effort', despite the deteriorated situation. Economist Ahmad Tavakkoli also ran on a platform of economic reform and more benefits for the working-class.

The Freedom Movement and the Nation Party, called  to boycott the election due to "lack of fundamental freedoms and the denial of official recognition to most political parties".

Candidates

Disqualified candidates 
The Guardian Council disqualified some candidates who enrolled to run for president, including:
 Ebrahim Yazdi,  Head of Political Bureau of Freedom Movement of Iran

Results

References

Presidential elections in Iran
1993 elections in Iran
June 1993 events in Asia
Iran